Šárka Kašpárková (born 20 May 1971) is a Czech former track and field athlete who specialised in the triple jump.

She attended her first Summer Olympics in 1992, participating in the high jump. She switched to the triple jump when it was given world championships status and won an Olympic bronze medal in the discipline at the 1996 Atlanta Games. She won another bronze at the 1997 IAAF World Indoor Championships and improved further by becoming the world champion at the 1997 World Championships in Athletics – her winning jump of 15.20 m was the second-farthest ever at the time.

She won both the indoor and outdoor silver medals at the European Athletics Championships. She won the bronze at the 1999 IAAF World Indoor Championships with her personal best indoor jump of 14.87 m, but failed to reach the podium at any major championships after that point, suffering a sharp decline in form.

Career

Early career 
At 1.86 metres tall, Kašpárková started her professional athletics career as a high jumper and finished sixth at the 1988 World Junior Championships in Athletics. She won the bronze medal in the 1989 European Athletics Junior Championships, and she went on to participate in the women's high jump at the 1992 Barcelona Olympics for Czechoslovakia. Her last period as a high jumper also brought her best performance – she jumped a personal best of 1.95 m in Banská Bystrica in early 1993.

When the female triple jump was introduced to the IAAF competitions, she moved to this discipline as one of the first competitors. She represented Europe in the triple jump at the 1992 IAAF World Cup, finishing in fifth place. She took part in the very first world championship event at the 1993 World Championships in Athletics and finished in seventh with a personal best jump of 14.16 m. She failed to break 14 metres the following year at the 1994 European Championships and had to settle for sixth place. She came close to the medals the following season with a fourth-place performance at the 1995 IAAF World Indoor Championships. She reverted to being out of medal contention at the 1995 World Championships in Athletics and 1995 IAAF Grand Prix Final.

Olympic and world medals 
She became the triple jump champion at the 1995 Summer Universiade. She won her first major medals soon after, taking the silver at the 1996 European Indoor Athletics Championships and winning her first Olympic medal for the Czech Republic with a bronze in the triple jump at the 1996 Summer Olympics. She confirmed her ability in the 1997 season, first winning a bronze at the 1997 IAAF World Indoor Championships, and then winning the World Championships with a national record jump of 15.20 m – this was the best jump that season and it made her the second best athlete in the event after Inessa Kravets at the time. A silver medal at the 1997 IAAF Grand Prix Final brought an end to a successful season.

She won a second European indoor silver at the 1998 Championships, finishing behind Ashia Hansen who jumped 15.16 m, and went on to take another silver later that season at the European Championships outdoors. She retained her indoor bronze at the 1999 IAAF World Indoor Championships with a personal best indoor jump of 14.87 m in Maebashi. She failed to retain her world title, however, at the 1999 World Championships in Athletics and could only manage 14.54 m for sixth place.

Decline 
Kašpárková suffered a marked decline after 1999 and she never jumped beyond 14.40 m after that point. Her mark of 14.34 m was enough to qualify for 2000 Olympic triple jump final, but she faulted three times and finished last. She took part in the 2003 World Championships in Athletics, 2004 IAAF World Indoor Championships and 2004 Summer Olympics, but each time she did not manage to jump more than 14 metres and was eliminated in the qualifiers.

She had a reversal of fortunes at the 2005 European Indoor Athletics Championships and took fourth place with a season's best of 14.34 m. She did not continue this form outdoors, however, and did not make the final at either the 2005 World Championships in Athletics or 2006 European Athletics Championships.

Personal life 
Kašpárková is in a relationship with her former coach Michal Pogány. Together they have a daughter, Tereza.

Personal bests 
She also competed in the 100 metres hurdles and long jump on limited occasions.

Source:

Competition record

Source:

References

External links 

 
 Kašpárková's bio on Infocentrum českých sportovců 
 

1971 births
Living people
Sportspeople from Karviná
Czech female high jumpers
Czech female triple jumpers
Olympic athletes of Czechoslovakia
Olympic athletes of the Czech Republic
Athletes (track and field) at the 1992 Summer Olympics
Athletes (track and field) at the 1996 Summer Olympics
Athletes (track and field) at the 2000 Summer Olympics
Athletes (track and field) at the 2004 Summer Olympics
Olympic bronze medalists for the Czech Republic
Masaryk University alumni
World Athletics Championships medalists
European Athletics Championships medalists
Medalists at the 1996 Summer Olympics
Olympic bronze medalists in athletics (track and field)
Universiade medalists in athletics (track and field)
Goodwill Games medalists in athletics
Universiade gold medalists for the Czech Republic
Universiade silver medalists for the Czech Republic
World Athletics Championships winners
Medalists at the 1993 Summer Universiade
Medalists at the 1995 Summer Universiade
Competitors at the 1998 Goodwill Games